Jonathan Serge Folly Ayité (born 21 July 1985) is a Togolese professional footballer who played as a striker for Olympiakos Nicosia and the Togo national football team.

Career
In 2013, he played 3 matches at 2013 Africa Cup of Nations where his national team reached the quarterfinals.

In the 2016–17 winter transfer window, Ayité left Alanyaspor for TFF First League club Yeni Malatyaspor.

On 11 October 2018, Ayité signed for Keşla FK until the end of the 2018–19 season.

On 20 August 2019, Ayité signed for Cypriot First Division club Olympiakos Nicosia.

Personal life
Ayité's younger brother, Floyd, is also an international footballer for Togo and Gençlerbirliği.

References

External links

 

1985 births
Living people
Footballers from Bordeaux
Citizens of Togo through descent
Togolese footballers
French footballers
Togo international footballers
Togolese expatriate footballers
Expatriate footballers in France
Expatriate footballers in Turkey
Ligue 1 players
Ligue 2 players
TFF First League players
Stade Brestois 29 players
Nîmes Olympique players
Alanyaspor footballers
Yeni Malatyaspor footballers
Samsunspor footballers
Association football forwards
French sportspeople of Togolese descent
Olympiakos Nicosia players
2010 Africa Cup of Nations players
2013 Africa Cup of Nations players